Wayne County Courthouse may refer to:

 Wayne County Courthouse (Georgia), Jesup, Georgia, listed on the National Register of Historic Places (NRHP)
 Wayne County Courthouse (Illinois), in Fairfield, Illinois, built in 1890s
 Wayne County Courthouse (Indiana), in Richmond, Indiana, 1893-built, NRHP-listed
 Wayne County Courthouse (Iowa), in Corydon, Iowa
 Wayne County Building, Detroit, Michigan, formerly known as Wayne County Courthouse, NRHP-listed
 Wayne County Courthouse (Nebraska), in Wayne, Nebraska, 1899-built and NRHP-listed
 Wayne County Courthouse District, in Wooster, Ohio, 1879-built and NRHP-listed
Wayne County Courthouse (Tennessee), Waynesboro, Tennessee, NRHP-listed